Whitehall in Columbus, Mississippi, also known as J.W. Hardy Estate, is an antebellum architecture historic house.

Built in 1843 by prominent attorney and planter James Walton Harris, Whitehall is a classic example of Greek Revival architecture.  Half-pilasters attached to the façade add a graceful accent to the house.  The original property extended over the entire city block and included gardens, stables, a carriage house, and slaves' quarters.  During the Civil War it served as a hospital for Confederate soldiers.

During World War II the Columbus Civil Air Patrol unit often met in the living room at Whitehall. The basement at Whitehall was turned into a servicemen's club called the "Drop in Hangar". It was decorated with war time Disney cartoon images, several inscribed "Happy landings at Whitehall - Walt Disney". (Source Ida Billups Ward, conveyed by Rufus Ward.)

Whitehall can be visited during the Columbus, Mississippi Spring Pilgrimage of antebellum homes.

References

External links
Flickr pic
J.W. Hardy Estate, at Historic American Buildings Survey
Columbus Pilgrimage Welcome to Columbus

Antebellum architecture
Columbus, Mississippi
Greek Revival houses in Mississippi
Houses in Lowndes County, Mississippi